Arianna Caruso (born 6 November 1999) is an Italian professional footballer who plays as a midfielder for Serie A club Juventus FC and the Italy women's national team.

Career
Caruso has been capped for the Italy national team, appearing for the team during the UEFA Women's Euro 2021 qualifying cycle.

She scored her first international goal against Israel on 24 February 2021 at the UEFA Women's Euro 2022 qualifying.

International goals
Scores and results are list Italy's goal tally first.

Honours
Juventus
 Serie A: 2020–21, 2021–22
 Coppa Italia: 
 Supercoppa Italiana: 2020–21, 2021–22

References

External links
 
 
 

1999 births
Living people
Italian women's footballers
Italy women's international footballers
Women's association football midfielders
Juventus F.C. (women) players
Competitors at the 2019 Summer Universiade
Res Roma players
UEFA Women's Euro 2022 players